Biotite is a common group of phyllosilicate minerals within the mica group, with the approximate chemical formula . It is primarily a solid-solution series between the iron-endmember annite,  and the magnesium-endmember phlogopite; more aluminous end-members include siderophyllite and eastonite. Biotite was regarded as a mineral species by the International Mineralogical Association until 1998, when its status was changed to a mineral group. The term biotite is still used to describe unanalysed dark micas in the field. Biotite was named by J.F.L. Hausmann in 1847 in honor of the French physicist Jean-Baptiste Biot, who performed early research into the many optical properties of mica.

Members of the biotite group are sheet silicates. Iron, magnesium, aluminium, silicon, oxygen, and hydrogen form sheets that are weakly bound together by potassium ions. The term "iron mica" is sometimes used for iron-rich biotite, but the term also refers to a flaky micaceous form of haematite, and the field term Lepidomelane for unanalysed iron-rich Biotite avoids this ambiguity. Biotite is also sometimes called "black mica" as opposed to "white mica" (muscovite) – both form in the same rocks, and in some instances side by side.

Properties

Like other mica minerals, biotite has a highly perfect basal cleavage, and consists of flexible sheets, or lamellae, which easily flake off.  It has a monoclinic crystal system, with tabular to prismatic crystals with an obvious pinacoid termination.  It has four prism faces and two pinacoid faces to form a pseudohexagonal crystal.  Although not easily seen because of the cleavage and sheets, fracture is uneven. It appears greenish to brown or black, and even yellow when weathered. It can be transparent to opaque, has a vitreous to pearly luster, and a grey-white streak. When biotite crystals are found in large chunks, they are called "books" because they resemble books with pages of many sheets. The color of biotite is usually black and the mineral has a hardness of 2.5–3 on the Mohs scale of mineral hardness.

Biotite dissolves in both acid and alkaline aqueous solutions, with the highest dissolution rates at low pH. However, biotite dissolution is highly anisotropic with crystal edge surfaces (h k0) reacting 45 to 132 times faster than basal surfaces (001).

Optical properties

In thin section, biotite exhibits moderate relief and a pale to deep greenish brown or brown color, with moderate to strong pleochroism. Biotite has a high birefringence which can be partially masked by its deep intrinsic color. Under cross-polarized light, biotite exhibits extinction approximately parallel to cleavage lines, and can have characteristic bird's eye maple extinction, a mottled appearance caused by the distortion of the mineral's flexible lamellae during grinding of the thin section. Basal sections of biotite in thin section are typically approximately hexagonal in shape and usually appear isotropic under cross-polarized light.

Structure
Like other micas, biotite has a crystal structure described as TOT-c, meaning that it is composed of parallel TOT layers weakly bonded to each other by cations (c). The TOT layers in turn consist of two tetrahedral sheets (T) strongly bonded to the two faces of a single octahedral sheet (O). It is the relatively weak ionic bonding between TOT layers that gives biotite its perfect basal cleavage.

The tetrahedral sheets consist of silica tetrahedra, which are silicon ions surrounded by four oxygen ions. In biotite, one in four silicon ions is replaced by an aluminium ion. The tetrahedra each share three of their four oxygen ions with neighboring tetrahedra to produce a hexagonal sheet. The remaining oxygen ion (the apical oxygen ion) is available to bond with the octahedral sheet.

The octahedral sheet in biotite is a trioctahedral sheet having the structure of a sheet of the mineral brucite, with magnesium or ferrous iron being the usual cations. Apical oxygens take the place of some of the hydroxyl ions that would be present in a brucite sheet, bonding the tetrahedral sheets tightly to the octahedral sheet.

Tetrahedral sheets have a strong negative charge, since their bulk composition is AlSi3O105-. The trioctahedral sheet has a positive charge, since its bulk composition is M3(OH)24+ (M represents a divalent ion such as ferrous iron or magnesium) The combined TOT layer has a residual negative charge, since its bulk composition is M3(AlSi3O10)(OH)2−. The remaining negative charge of the TOT layer is neutralized by the interlayer potassium ions.

Because the hexagons in the T and O sheets are slightly different in size, the sheets are slightly distorted when they bond into a TOT layer. This breaks the hexagonal symmetry and reduces it to monoclinic symmetry. However, the original hexahedral symmetry is discernible in the pseudohexagonal character of biotite crystals.

Occurrence

Members of the biotite group are found in a wide variety of igneous and metamorphic rocks. For instance, biotite occurs in the lava of Mount Vesuvius and in the Monzoni intrusive complex of the western Dolomites. Biotite in granite tends to be poorer in magnesium than the biotite found in its volcanic equivalent, rhyolite. Biotite is an essential phenocryst in some varieties of lamprophyre. Biotite is occasionally found in large cleavable crystals, especially in pegmatite veins, as in New England, Virginia and North Carolina USA. Other notable occurrences include Bancroft and Sudbury, Ontario Canada. It is an essential constituent of many metamorphic schists, and it forms in suitable compositions over a wide range of pressure and temperature. It has been estimated that biotite comprises up to 7% of the exposed continental crust.

An igneous rock composed almost entirely of dark mica (biotite or phlogopite) is known as a glimmerite or biotitite.

Biotite may be found in association with its common alteration product chlorite.

The largest documented single crystals of biotite were approximately  sheets found in Iveland, Norway.

Uses
Biotite is used extensively to constrain ages of rocks, by either potassium-argon dating or argon–argon dating. Because argon escapes readily from the biotite crystal structure at high temperatures, these methods may provide only minimum ages for many rocks. Biotite is also useful in assessing temperature histories of metamorphic rocks, because the partitioning of iron and magnesium between biotite and garnet is sensitive to temperature.

References 

Magnesium minerals
Iron(II) minerals
Potassium minerals
Aluminium minerals
Phyllosilicates
Monoclinic minerals
Minerals in space group 12
Mica group